Brezovica pri Zlatem Polju is a small settlement in the hills northeast of Lukovica pri Domžalah in the eastern part of the Upper Carniola region of Slovenia.

Name
The name of the settlement was changed from Brezovica to Brezovica pri Zlatem Polju in 1953. In the past the German name was Bresowitz.

References

External links

Brezovica pri Zlatem Polju on Geopedia

Populated places in the Municipality of Lukovica